Floresville is a city in Wilson County, Texas, United States. According to the U.S. Census Bureau, its population was at 7,203 at the 2020 Census. It is the county seat of Wilson County. The city is also part of the San Antonio metropolitan statistical area.

Geography
Floresville is located at  (29.139805, −98.161692).

The city is about 35 miles southeast of downtown San Antonio.

History

Historic dwellers of the area were Lipan Apache tribes. After the Spanish discovery of the Americas, Western settlement came in the form of Christian missions. Thus, in the mid-18th century, Mision de las Cabras, "the goat ranch", was established near Floresville as a mission ranching operation for Mission Espada. Indian and Spanish vaqueros lived and worshiped here, while caring for the herds of animals. This was the precursor of the Texas ranching industry.

The land and name for this town would be given to honor the Flores de Abrego family, who were descendants of the former Canary Islanders. Don Francisco Flores de Abrego was an early settler of this area, his ranch was six miles (10 km) northwest of the site of present Floresville. Four of his sons, Salvador, Manuel N., Nepomuceno, and Jose Maria served Texas in the 1835–1836 Revolution.
 
Don Erasmo Seguin (born 1782, in San Antonio) also settled in this area in late 1824, purchasing a ranch, and with his wife raised a family here. His ranch, "Casa Blanca", began as a  tract near present Floresville. The Erasmo Seguin family had previously lived in San Antonio de Bexar, and also owned a  ranch further south (in present Karnes County), but now chose to build and live in Floresville.

Juan Seguín (born 1806, in San Antonio), one of Erasmo Seguin's sons, was also a prominent Texas military and political figure. He returned with his family to again reside on his father's Floresville ranch from 1848 to 1852. Juan then built a home in 1852 on a property adjacent to his father's, 3 miles northwest of Floresville's center, living there until about 1883. He had come back from a necessary self-imposed exile in Mexico, from 1842 to 1848.
 
As a Texian Army colonel, Juan Seguin, a true Texas Revolution (1835–1836) hero,  had later been blamed by some Anglo Texans for the loss of San Antonio (then part of the Republic of Texas), from attacks by Gra. Rafael Vásquez under Gra. Santa Anna's command in 1842, and his life was threatened. Santa Anna was trying to restore Texas to Mexican control. Though Col. Seguin had beat Gra. Vásquez's forces back across the Rio Grande, he was disparaged as having Mexican sympathies and loyalties. In exile (from 1842), once in Mexico, he then agreed to serve under Santa Anna in the Mexican–American War of 1846–1848. Gra. Santa Anna had attempted to regain Texas from the United States in 1846, after Texas was willingly annexed by the US in 1845. After that war, Juan Seguin then left Mexico behind in 1848 and returned to the now US state of Texas, to his father's Floresville ranch.

2015 tornado

In the early hours of October 30, an EF2 tornado touched down south of downtown. The tornado strengthened at a slow rate until it got to the city limits. The tornado threw a trailer on top of the Holiday Inn building. Floresville High School was severely damaged to the point where it almost collapsed. A store was pummeled by debris before the storm left the city limits. The tornado tracked into the oil fields toward Sutherland Springs. It lifted up before reaching Sutherland Springs.

Demographics

As of the 2020 United States census,  7,203 people, 2,442 households, and 1,891 families were residing in the city.

As of the census of 2000,  5,868 people, 1,908 households, and 1,457 families resided in the city. The population density was 1,234.5 people per square mile (477.0/km2). The 2,114 housing units had an average density of 444.8 per square mile (171.8/km2). The racial makeup of the city was 71.32% White, 1.64% African American, 0.48% Native American, 0.34% Asian,  22.94% from other races, and 3.29% from two or more races. Hispanics or Latinos of any race were 64.01% of the population.

Of the 1,908 households,  38.8% had children under  18 living with them, 54.2% were married couples living together, 17.3% had a female householder with no husband present, and 23.6% were not families. About 21.3% of all households were made up of individuals, and 10.2% had someone living alone who was 65 or older. The average household size was 2.89, and the average family size was 3.36.

In the city, the age distribution was 29.4% under the age of 18, 8.8% from 18 to 24, 28.1% from 25 to 44, 19.0% from 45 to 64, and 14.7% who were 65 or older. The median age was 33 years. For every 100 females, there were 93.5 males. For every 100 females 18 and over, there were 91.5 males.

The median income for a household in the city was $30,093, and for a family was $34,482. Males had a median income of $27,152 versus $19,616 for females. The per capita income for the city was $13,340. About 14.0% of families and 18.2% of the population were below the poverty line, including 22.4% of those under age 18 and 16.7% of those age 65 or over.
 `

Education
The city of Floresville is served by the Floresville Independent School District and home to the Floresville High School Tigers.

Film appearances

Portions of the 1974 feature film Sugarland Express directed by Steven Spielberg were filmed in Floresville.  In the film, the town is called "Rodrigo".  Other scenes were filmed at various locations in Wilson County and at the nearby Lone Oak community.

Portions of the 1975 American drama film The Great Waldo Pepper directed, produced, and co-written by George Roy Hill was filmed on the outskirts near Floresville and nearby Poth. Set during 1926–1931, the film stars Robert Redford as a disaffected World War I veteran pilot who missed the opportunity to fly in combat, and examines his sense of postwar dislocation in 1920s America. The cast includes Margot Kidder, Bo Svenson, Edward Herrmann, and Susan Sarandon.

Portions of made for TV movie Thaddeus Rose and Eddie (1978) starring Johnny and June Carter Cash were filmed in Floresville.

Portions of the 1980 movie The Big Brawl with Jackie Chan were filmed in Floresville's downtown area.

Gallery

Climate
The climate in this area is characterized by hot, humid summers and generally mild to cool winters.  According to the Köppen climate classification, Floresville has a humid subtropical climate, Cfa on climate maps.

Notable people

 John Connally, Governor of Texas; U.S. Secretary of the Navy in the Kennedy Administration; Secretary of the Treasury under President Richard Nixon; for a time he was considered a serious contender for the U.S. presidency. 
 Shelley Sekula-Gibbs, former member of the United States House of Representatives
 Erasmo Seguín, politician
 
 Beatrice Valdez Ximénez, sculptor
 Vicente T. Ximenes, a former member of the Equal Employment Opportunity Commission and a civil rights activist

References

External links
 City of Floresville
 Floresville Economic Development Corporation
 Wilson County News

Cities in Texas
Cities in Wilson County, Texas
County seats in Texas
Greater San Antonio